Pue may refer to:
 Pue language of Papua New Guinea
 pue, the ISO 639-3 code for the Puelche language of Argentina
 W. Wesley Pue (born 1954), Canadian lawyer

PUE may refer to:
 People's Union for Economy, a pressure group in the United Kingdom
 Pneumonia of unknown etiology
 Power usage effectiveness, the ratio of total amount of power used by the data center facility to the power delivered to IT equipment
 Poznań University of Economics, a university in Poland

See also
 PU (disambiguation)
 Pew (disambiguation)